The Music Man (full title Jimmy Giuffre and his Music Men Play The Music Man) is an album by American jazz composer and arranger Jimmy Giuffre featuring tunes from Meredith Willson's 1957 Broadway musical, The Music Man  which was released on the Atlantic label in February 1958.

Reception

Scott Yanow of Allmusic states: "this particular set finds Giuffre (tripling as usual on clarinet, tenor and baritone) leading a somewhat conventional band, a seven-horn pianoless nonet. ...The arrangements (all by Giuffre) swing, the beauty and joy of the melodies are brought out, and the leader is in top form. A true rarity".

Track listing 
All compositions by Meredith Willson
 "Iowa Stubborn" - 3:57
 "Goodnight My Someone" - 2:45
 "Seventy-Six Trombones" - 3:06
 "Marian the Librarian"- 2:40
 "My White Knight" - 3:31
 "The Wells Fargo Wagon" - 4:02
 "It's You" - 3:34
 "Shipoopi" - 2:51
 "Lida Rose (Will I Ever Tell You)" - 3:32
 "Gary, Indiana" - 2:56
 "Till There Was You" - 3:27 
Recorded at Coastal Recording Studios in New York City on December 31, 1957 (tracks 3 & 4), January 2, 1958 (tracks 2, 5 & 11), January 3, 1958 (tracks 6-8) and January 6, 1958 (tracks 1, 9 & 10)

Personnel 
Jimmy Giuffre - clarinet, tenor saxophone, baritone saxophone
Art Farmer, Bernie Glow, Phil Sunkel, Joe Wilder - trumpet
Al Cohn, Eddie Wasserman - tenor saxophone
Sol Schlinger - baritone saxophone
Wendell Marshall - bass
Ed Shaughnessy - drums

References 

Jimmy Giuffre albums
1959 albums
Atlantic Records albums
Albums produced by Nesuhi Ertegun
Covers albums
The Music Man